Men of a Certain Age is  an American comedy-drama television series created by Ray Romano and Mike Royce, that ran on TNT from December 7, 2009, to July 6, 2011. The hour-long program stars Romano, Andre Braugher, and Scott Bakula as three best friends in their late forties dealing with the realities of being middle aged. It won a Peabody Award in 2010.
On July 15, 2011, TNT cancelled the series after two seasons spanning 22 episodes.

Plot
The series follows the adventures of Joe, Owen, and Terry, three men in their late 40s who have been friends since college. Joe (Ray Romano) is a timid, separated (later divorced) father of two (Brittany Curran as Lucy, and Braeden Lemasters as Albert) who had dreamed of becoming a pro golfer but now owns a party supply store, and has a gambling addiction. Owen (Andre Braugher) is an anxiety-stricken, diabetic husband and father, who works at a job he hates, selling cars at a dealership owned and managed by his father, former NBA player Owen Thoreau, Sr. (Richard Gant). Terry (Scott Bakula) is an apartment building manager and semi-retired actor desperate to relive his past glory. He has never married, and usually dates much younger women.

In the second season, Owen's father has retired and left Owen in charge of the dealership, where Owen hires Terry as a salesman. Joe, now officially divorced, turns 50 and attempts to qualify for the PGA Senior Tour.

Cast and characters

Main cast
 Ray Romano as Joe Tranelli, the protagonist. An aspiring golfer who never reached the professional level, Joe now owns a party store. He is separated from his wife and has two children. 
 Scott Bakula as Terry Elliot, an apartment building manager and former actor struggling to relive his glory days. He has never married. 
 Andre Braugher as Owen Thoreau, Jr., an anxiety-suffering, diabetic car salesman working for his father. He is married and has three children.
 LisaGay Hamilton as Melissa Thoreau, Owen's wife. 
 Richard Gant as Owen Thoreau, Sr, Owen's father, the owner of a Chevrolet car dealership and former NBA player. 
 Brian J. White as Marcus, a car salesman who works with Owen.
 Melinda McGraw as Erin Riley (season 2 only)
 Lil' JJ as Dashaun (season 1 only, recurring season 2), a party store employee 
 Kwesi Boakye as Jamie Thoreau
 Brittany Curran as Lucy Tranelli
 Braeden Lemasters as Albert Tranelli
 Isaiah Montgomery as Michael Thoreau

Recurring cast
 Emily Rios as Maria
 Eddie Shin as Carl
 Carla Gallo as Annie
 Matt Price as Lawrence
 Michael Hitchcock as Dave
 Albert Hall as Bruce
 Patricia de Leon as Joe's Fantasy Woman
 Jon Manfrellotti as Manfro, Joe's bookmaker
 Penelope Ann Miller as Joe's ex-wife, Sonia Tranelli
 Robert Loggia as Joe's father, Artie

Development
In March 2008, TNT announced that it had ordered a pilot based on a script written by Ray Romano and Mike Royce. Both men had previously worked together on Everybody Loves Raymond. Andre Braugher and Scott Bakula were announced in June and July, respectively, to also star in the series with Romano. In January 2009, TNT ordered 10 episodes of Men of a Certain Age. It is Bakula's first series as a regular cast member since Star Trek: Enterprise, Braugher's first regular role since Thief ended in 2006, and Romano's first series since Everybody Loves Raymond wrapped in May 2005. Men of a Certain Age premiered on TNT on December 7, 2009. It was given a TV-MA-L rating because of strong language.
On January 14, 2010 TNT renewed the show for a second season, which premiered on December 6, 2010. The second season was aired in two batches of six episodes each.

On July 15, 2011, TNT announced that they would not be renewing Men of a Certain Age for a third season.

Episodes

Series overview

Season 1 (2009–10)

Season 2 (2010–11)

Critical reception

Season one was met with positive reviews. According to aggregate review site Rotten Tomatoes, it holds an 89% approval rating based on 18 reviews. The sites consensus reads: "Witty, insightful, and poignant, Men of a Certain Age is a second-act triumph for stars Scott Bakula, Andre Braugher, and Ray Romano." It holds a Metacritic score of 78 out of 100, based on 24 collected reviews, indicating "generally favorable reviews".

Season two was met with equally positive reviews. It holds a 100% approval rating on Rotten Tomatoes based on 14 reviews. The sites consensus reads: "Sharply written and deftly acted, Men of a Certain Age continues to be an observational sitcom of rare insight and depth." It holds a Metacritic score of 86 out of 100, based on 15 collected reviews, indicating "universal acclaim."

Home media

Awards and nominations

Broadcasting

International
In Canada, Men of a Certain Age can be seen on Super Channel. In Latin America, Men of a Certain Age premiered on July 13, 2010 on the prime time block of Warner Channel.

Streaming 
Men of a Certain Age is available to stream for two seasons on WarnerMedia's HBO Max, which launched on May 27, 2020.

References

External links
 

2009 American television series debuts
2000s American comedy-drama television series
2011 American television series endings
2010s American comedy-drama television series
English-language television shows
Peabody Award-winning television programs
TNT (American TV network) original programming
Television shows set in Los Angeles
Television series about old age
Television Academy Honors winners